The Improviser is a live album by trumpeter Chet Baker which was recorded in Norway in 1983 and first released on the Cadence Jazz label.

Reception 

The Allmusic review by Scott Yanow states "Baker recorded this Cadence LP in Norway, backed by a pair of fine Norwegian trios that in both cases include pianist Per Husby. ... Although a little loose in spots, this is an excellent date by the colorful trumpeter".

Track listing 
 "Margarine" (Hal Galper) – 9:35
 "Polka Dots and Moonbeams" (Jimmy Van Heusen, Johnny Burke) – 8:15
 "Beatrice" (Sam Rivers) – 8:55
 "Gnid" (Tadd Dameron) – 10:25
 "Night Bird" (Galper) – 13:25
Recorded in Oslo, Norway at the Hot House on August 15, 1983 (tracks 4 & 5) and at Club 7 on August 30, 1983 (tracks 1-3).

Personnel 
Chet Baker – trumpet
Per Husby – piano
Bjørn Kjellemyr (tracks 4 & 5), Terje Venaas (tracks 1-3) – bass
Ole Jacob Hansen (tracks 1-3), Espen Rud (tracks 4 & 5) – drums

References 

Chet Baker live albums
1984 live albums
Cadence Jazz Records live albums